Glaucium calycinum is a species of flowering plant in the horned poppy genus which is endemic to Iran.

Description 
It has branches, usually hairless, on its stems, though the lower parts of the stem may have a few sparse hairs. The seed pods are of the silique type and may or may not have hairs; if they do then these are scale-shaped while the plant is immature.

Similar species 
Glaucium yazdianum has similar petal color and leaf shape to G. calycinum. However, their cellular structures, shape of trichomes on the siliquae, and bud length differ in several ways.

Taxonomy 
The species has two accepted subspecies:

 G. calycinum subsp. calycinum
 G. calycinum subsp. aserbaidshanicum Mory

Distribution and habitat 
Glaucium calycinum is only found in Iran, making it endemic to the country. Specifically, plants of the species have been recorded from the central, northern, and northwestern parts of Iran. The plant grows along roads and on hillsides, and the ground on which it is found is clay-rich or bare.

References 

Papaveroideae